Eric Verhagen (born 21 February 1964) is a retired Dutch sidecarcross passenger and double World Champion.

He has also won the Dutch national sidecarcross championship four times, in 1986, 1989, 1990 and 1992. All his successes were achieved with Eimbert Timmermans as the team's driver.

Sidecarcross world championship results
Eric Verhagen's first success as a sidecarcross rider came in 1986, when he took out the Dutch national championship, together with Eimbert Timmermans. This season was also his first in the sidecarcross world championship, where the team finished sixteen's, with two seventh place race finishes as their best results.

After similar results in 1987, the team greatly improved in 1988, coming fifth in the world championship and taking out their first race win in the Dutch GP. After continuing good results in 1989 and 1990 and two more Dutch national championships, the team managed to take out their first world championship in 1991.

The following season, 1992, saw a repeat of the world championship and also a fourth Dutch title. Verhagen retired from the competition after that, as did Timmermans.

Season by season

Source:

Honours

World Championship
 Champions: (2) 1991, 1992

Netherlands
 Champions: (4) 1986, 1989, 1990, 1992

References

External links
 The World Championship on Sidecarcross.com

1964 births
Living people
Dutch sidecarcross riders
People from Schijndel
Sportspeople from North Brabant